Francisco Manel Ruano Busán (born 16 July 1974) is a Spanish retired footballer who played as a right winger, and a current manager.

Playing career
Born in Barcelona, Catalonia, Ruano started playing football with UDA Gramenet in 1993, in Segunda División B. The following year, he joined Atlético Madrid; initially assigned to the reserves also in the third division, he made his first-team debut on 4 January 1995 by starting in a 0–0 away draw against CD Mensajero in the Copa del Rey.

Ruano first appeared in La Liga on 15 January 1995, coming on as a second-half substitute in a 1–1 home draw against SD Compostela. In June, after 12 competitive matches, he moved to Real Valladolid.

After only three competitive appearances, Ruano was loaned to fellow top-level club Rayo Vallecano in January 1996. He scored his first professional goal on 14 April of that year, the first in a 2–4 loss at RCD Espanyol.

Ruano signed for Segunda División side Levante UD in July 1996, being an undisputed starter during his first and only season. The following year, he returned to the top flight after joining Mérida UD.

In the summer of 1998, Ruano moved to Málaga CF of the second tier. He helped the club in their promotion by appearing regularly, but received little playing time in the following years mainly due to injuries.

On 10 December 2002, Ruano was loaned to Córdoba CF until the following June. He cut ties with his parent club in August 2003, and subsequently represented amateurs UE Castelldefels and CF Balaguer, retiring with the latter in 2006 at the age of 31.

Coaching career
Ruano returned to Málaga on 8 June 2011, being appointed manager of the youth setup. On 20 June 2015 he was named coach of Atlético Malagueño, replacing Salva Ballesta.

In June 2019, Ruano became coach of Betis Deportivo Balompié also in Tercera División.

Managerial statistics

References

External links

1974 births
Living people
Footballers from Barcelona
Spanish footballers
Association football wingers
La Liga players
Segunda División players
Segunda División B players
Tercera División players
UDA Gramenet footballers
CF Damm players
Atlético Madrid B players
Atlético Madrid footballers
Real Valladolid players
Rayo Vallecano players
Levante UD footballers
Mérida UD footballers
Málaga CF players
Córdoba CF players
CF Balaguer footballers
Spanish football managers
Primera Federación managers
Segunda División B managers
Tercera División managers